Sonic Prime is an animated television series based on the Sonic the Hedgehog video game series, co-produced by Sega of America, Netflix Animation, WildBrain Studios and Man of Action Entertainment. It is the sixth animated television series based on the franchise.

The first season, comprising eight episodes, was released on Netflix on December 15, 2022. According to WildBrain Studios, the series is to have at least 24 episodes in total. Sega confirmed that more episodes will be released in 2023.

Synopsis
During a battle with Dr. Eggman, Sonic recklessly shatters the Paradox Prism, a crystalline artifact with reality-bending powers, which destroys the universe and creates the "Shatterverse", a multiverse of alternative dimensions called "Shatterspaces", each of them formed by one of the Prism shards and inhabited by alternative versions of Sonic's friends (Tails, Knuckles, Amy Rose, Rouge and Big), but lack their own versions of him.

Sonic first ends up in New Yoke City, a futuristic dystopian version of Green Hill ruled by a group of Eggman variants who call themselves the Chaos Council, who used their realm's shard to conquer it with ease. Even worse, they seek to extend their reach and conquer the entire Shatterverse after learning of its existence through Sonic, but are opposed by him and a resistance formed by denizen versions of his friends. While Seeking to reassemble the Prism and restore reality, Sonic ventures to other Shatterspaces such as Boscage Maze and the No Place, two worlds covered in jungle and water inhabited by feral and pirate versions of his friends respectively.

Voice cast

 Deven Mack as Sonic the Hedgehog, Orbot and Cubot
 Brian Drummond as Dr. Eggman / Mr. Dr. Eggman / Dr. Done It, Stormbeard
 Ashleigh Ball as Miles "Tails" Prower / Tails Nine / Mangey Tails / Sails Tails, Bunny Bones
 Adam Nurada as Knuckles the Echidna
 Shannon Chan-Kent as Amy Rose / Rusty Rose / Thorn Rose / Black Rose
 Ian Hanlin as Shadow the Hedgehog, Big the Cat / Denizen 1998 / Hangry Cat / Catfish
 Kazumi Evans as Rouge the Bat / Rebel Rouge / Prim Rouge / Batten Rouge
 Vincent Tong as Renegade Knucks / Gnarly Knuckles / Knuckles the Dread, Dr. Deep / Dr. Don't / Dr. Babble
 Rachell Hofstetter as Squad Commander Red
 Seán McLoughlin as Jack

Episodes

Production
Sonic Prime was officially announced in February 2021, though the development of the series was initially revealed in a deleted tweet in December 2020. The series will have 24 episodes overall. Colleen O'Shaughnessey, known for portraying Miles "Tails" Prower since 2014, responded to a tweet on Twitter that she won't be reprising the role in the Netflix series, due to Canadian content and union laws meaning that a large portion of voice actors portraying roles in Canadian television programs have to be Canadian. In May 2022, it was announced that Deven Mack would voice the titular character for the series.

The series is made by Man of Action and WildBrain Studios, and marks as their second collaboration on a video game based series after Mega Man: Fully Charged, along with Netflix Animation and Sega's animation studio Marza Animation Planet. One of the writers, Duncan Rouleau, stated that the series will be set in "the video game universe created by Sonic Team" and that "possible Sega crossovers are not ruled out." According to executive producer Logan McPherson, the series is canon to the games' timeline.
In June 2021, concept art of the series was discovered on a now deleted artist's portfolio.

Duncan Rouleau later confirmed that Ian Flynn, who has written for the Archie, Boom, IDW series and the newly released Sonic Frontiers, would be a consultant. Additionally, The Willoughbys director Kris Pearn worked on the series as a creative consultant with My Little Pony: Equestria Girls director Ishi Rudell as an episodic director.

Release
The first season of Sonic Prime, consisting of eight episodes, was released on December 15, 2022. The first episode premiered on Gamefam's Roblox game, "Sonic Speed Simulator" on December 10, 2022. The release timeframes of the next seasons have not been officially confirmed, but will be in the "not too distant future" after the first season, according to executive producer Logan McPherson. On January 2023, Season 2 was announced to be released later in the same year.

Reception

Audience viewership
On December 20, 2022, Netflix announced that Sonic Prime was ranked number five of the top 10 on English television to be watched with 27.7 million hours watched between December 12 and 18.

Critical response
Sonic Prime received generally positive reviews from critics with praise given to the voice acting, story, and animation; but some criticized its writing. On Rotten Tomatoes, it has a score of 60% based on reviews from 5 critics.

Polly Conway of Common Sense Media said that it is fun, frenetic animated series touts teamwork and has violence. Kennet Seward Jr of IGN gave the film a score of 8 out of 10, calling it a "fun and family-friendly" show for new and old fans, said "Sonic Prime is a fun and overall entertaining, family-friendly show. Sitting tonally between the 1992 Adventures of Sonic the Hedgehog and 93’ Sonic the Hedgehog – which features a similar “freedom fighters seeking to overthrow a cruel leader” vibe – it offers an exciting look at the past while presenting some new ideas. It has some issues concerning pacing and the abrupt ending of the first season won’t do it any favors. That said, Sonic Prime should be well received by new and longtime franchise fans."

Josua Kristian Mccoy of Game Rant gave Prime 3.5 out of 5, labelling it "very good" and also calling it a lot of fun: "Sonic Prime is yet another argument for Sonic as a TV star first and a game character second. Sonic fans will love the showcase for their favorite characters and the fast-paced action. Despite some weak writing and a bit too much repetition, Sonic Prime is a lot of fun. Enjoy the Blue Blur's journey into the multiverse."

References

External links
 WildBrain's official announcement
 
 Sonic Prime on IMDb

2022 American television series debuts
2022 Canadian television series debuts
2020s American animated television series
2020s Canadian animated television series
2020s Canadian comic science fiction television series
American children's animated action television series
American children's animated adventure television series
American computer-animated television series
Canadian children's animated action television series
Canadian children's animated adventure television series
Canadian computer-animated television series
Animated series based on Sonic the Hedgehog
Animated television series about hedgehogs
English-language Netflix original programming
Netflix children's programming
Television series about parallel universes
Television series by DHX Media
Television series by Netflix Animation